Budhpur is a village in Rewari mandal of Rewari district, in the Indian state of Haryana.

Demographics
As of 2011 India census, Budhpur had a population of 1909 in 391 households. Males (387) constitute 53.3%  of the population and females (366) 46.6%. Budhpur has an average literacy rate of 84.3%, higher than the national  of 74%: male literacy is 88.5%, and female literacy is 61.4%. In Budhpur, 11.8% of the population is under 6 years of age.

Adjacent villages
 Kaluwas
 Chandawas

References

Villages in Rewari district